Edgecombe County is a county located in the U.S. state of North Carolina. As of the 2020 census, the population was 48,900. Its county seat is Tarboro.
Edgecombe County is part of the Rocky Mount, North Carolina, Metropolitan Statistical Area.

History
Historically home to the Tuscarora, a Native American tribe and First Nations band government of the Iroquoian family who where the most numerous Indigenous people in the area, living along the Roanoke, Neuse, Tar (Torhunta or Narhontes), and Pamlico rivers. After the 18th-century wars of 1711–1713 (known as the Tuscarora War) against English colonists and their Indigenous allies, most of the surviving Tuscarora left North Carolina and migrated north to Pennsylvania and New York, over a period of 90 years.  Although many descendants of the Tuscarora still live in some parts of the county.

The current county was formed in 1741 from Bertie County. It was named for Richard Edgcumbe, a Member of Parliament (MP) from 1701 to 1742 and a lord of the treasury, who became 1st Baron Richard Edgecombe in 1742. 

In 1746 part of Edgecombe County became Granville County; in 1758 another portion became Halifax County; and in 1777 yet another part became Nash County.  In 1855 the formation of Wilson County from parts of Edgecombe County, Johnston County, Nash County, and Wayne County reduced Edgecombe to its present size, with a minor boundary adjustments.

Geography

Major water bodies 
 Cokey Swamp
 Deep Creek
 Dickson Branch
 Fishing Creek
 Swift Creek
 Tar River
 Town Creek

Adjacent counties
 Halifax County - north
 Martin County - east
 Pitt County - south-southeast
 Wilson County - southwest
 Nash County - west

Major highways

  (Concurrency with US 64)
 
 
  (Princeville)
  (Rocky Mount)

Major Infrastructure 
 CSX Intermodal Terminal, Shared between Nash County
 Rocky Mount Station

Demographics

2020 census

As of the 2020 United States census, there were 48,900 people, 21,151 households, and 14,408 families residing in the county.

2010 census
As of the 2010 United States Census, there were 56,552 people living in the county. 57.4% were Black or African American, 38.8% White, 0.3% Native American, 0.2% Asian, 2.3% of some other race and 1.0% of two or more races. 3.7% were Hispanic or Latino (of any race).

2000 census
As of the census of 2000, there were 55,606 people, 20,392 households, and 14,804 families living in the county.  The population density was 110 people per square mile (43/km2).  There were 24,002 housing units at an average density of 48 per square mile (18/km2).  The racial makeup of the county was 57.46% Black or African American, 40.06% White, 0.20% Native American, 0.13% Asian, 0.01% Pacific Islander, 1.56% from other races, and 0.58% from two or more races.  2.79% of the population were Hispanic or Latino of any race.

There were 20,392 households, out of which 32.80% had children under the age of 18 living with them, 46.20% were married couples living together, 21.50% had a female householder with no husband present, and 27.40% were non-families. 24.00% of all households were made up of individuals, and 10.10% had someone living alone who was 65 years of age or older.  The average household size was 2.67 and the average family size was 3.16.

In the county, the population was spread out, with 27.10% under the age of 18, 8.60% from 18 to 24, 28.40% from 25 to 44, 23.40% from 45 to 64, and 12.50% who were 65 years of age or older.  The median age was 36 years. For every 100 females there were 86.80 males.  For every 100 females age 18 and over, there were 80.80 males.

The median income for a household in the county was $30,983, and the median income for a family was $35,902. Males had a median income of $27,300 versus $21,649 for females. The per capita income for the county was $14,435.  About 16.00% of families and 19.60% of the population were below the poverty line, including 27.50% of those under age 18 and 18.40% of those age 65 or over.

Government and politics
Edgecombe County is a member of the regional Upper Coastal Plain Council of Governments.

The North Carolina Department of Corrections previously operated the Fountain Correctional Center for Women in an unincorporated area in the county, near Rocky Mount. It closed in December 2014.

Education
Edgecombe County Public Schools has 14 schools ranging from pre-kindergarten to thirteenth grade. These are separated into four high schools, four middle schools, five elementary schools, and 1 K-8 school.  It was formed in 1993 from the merger of the old Edgecombe County Schools and Tarboro City Schools systems.

The county is home to Edgecombe Community College with campuses in Tarboro and Rocky Mount.

Communities

City
 Rocky Mount (largest city, partially located also in Nash County)

Towns

 Conetoe
 Leggett
 Macclesfield
 Pinetops
 Princeville
 Sharpsburg
 Speed
 Tarboro (county seat)
 Whitakers

Townships
The county is divided into fourteen townships, which are both numbered and named:

 1 (Tarboro)
 2 (Lower Conetoe)
 3 (Upper Conetoe)
 4 (Deep Creek)
 5 (Lower Fishing Creek)
 6 (Upper Fishing Creek)
 7 (Swift Creek)
 8 (Sparta)
 9 (Otter Creek)
 10 (Lower Town Creek)
 11 (Walnut Creek)
 12 (Rocky Mount)
 13 (Cokey)
 14 (Upper Town Creek)

Unincorporated communities
 Crisp
 Mercer

Notable people
 Duncan Lamont Clinch (1787–1849) – born at Ard-Lamont in Edgecombe County, American Army officer in the First and Second Seminole Wars
 Dorsey Pender (1834–1863) – born at Pender's Crossroads in Edgecombe County, Major General in the Confederate Army.
 Josiah Pender (1819-1864) – cousin to Dorsey Pender, who captured Fort Macon from Union soldiers in 1861.
 Hugh Shelton (born 1942) – four-star General and former Chairman of the Joint Chiefs of Staff, appointed by President Clinton.

See also
 List of counties in North Carolina
 National Register of Historic Places listings in Edgecombe County, North Carolina
 Edgecombe County serial killer
 Halifax District Brigade#Edgecombe County Regiment
 List of future Interstate Highways

References

External links

 
 
 NCGenWeb Edgecombe County - free genealogy resources for the county

 
Rocky Mount metropolitan area
1741 establishments in North Carolina
Populated places established in 1741
Black Belt (U.S. region)
Majority-minority counties in North Carolina